Frank "Lucky" (or "Lucks") Tower is the subject of an urban legend that said that he was a stoker (or fireman, in some versions)  who survived the sinking of , , and . There is no evidence that anyone was involved in all three disasters, and there was no one with the name of Frank Tower on the crew list on any of these vessels' respective voyages; however, there was one survivor and passenger named Frank Tower from Lusitania, and a William Clark who survived both the Titanic and Empress of Ireland sinkings.

The legend claims that he was a coal stoker on Titanic, and survived after she sank on her maiden voyage on 14 April 1912. Two years later, on 28 May 1914, Frank was allegedly aboard Empress of Ireland when she collided with the Norwegian collier  in the Saint Lawrence River. This disaster was considered the worst peacetime maritime disaster in Canadian history, and Tower was one of only 465 of the 1,477 aboard to survive. During World War I, Tower allegedly was serving as a crew member aboard RMS Lusitania. In the early afternoon of 7 May 1915, she was torpedoed by the German submarine  and sank eighteen minutes later. (It is rumored that he shouted "Now what?!" when the torpedo struck.) Again, Tower escaped the sinking ship, and swam to a nearby lifeboat.

Ripley's Believe It or Not reported the legend as if it were verifiably true.

Clive Cussler briefly cites this legendary figure in his nonfiction book The Sea Hunters, in the chapter concerning the U-20. He relates that after the sinking of Lusitania, Tower swore that he would take up farming and never go to sea again.

See also
 Casimir Polemus, who, according to legend, was the sole survivor of three different shipwrecks

References

Urban legends
Legendary American people
Shipwreck survivors
RMS Lusitania